Wooley is the surname of:

 Bob Wooley (born 1947), American politician appointed to the New Mexico House of Representatives in 2011
 Charles Wooley (born 1948), Australian journalist, reporter and writer
 Gilbert Wooley (1896–1953), English cricketer
 J. Robert Wooley (born 1953), American lawyer and politician
 Jessica Wooley (born 1968), American politician
 Jimmy Wooley (born 1949), American judoka
 John Wooley (born 1949), American author and editor
 Karen L. Wooley, American polymer chemist and professor
 Michael W. Wooley, retired US Air Force lieutenant general
 Michael-Leon Wooley (born 1971), American actor and singer
 Pete Wooley (born c. 1930), former Canadian Football League player
 Sheb Wooley (1921–2003), American actor and singer
 Trevor Wooley (born 1964), British mathematician

See also
 Wooley v. Maynard, a free speech Supreme Court case
 Woolley (disambiguation)